Viktor Hierländer (7 June 1900 – 20 January 1982) was an Austrian football player and manager.

He played for Floridsdorfer AC, SpVgg Fürth, FK Austria Wien, New York Giants and Wiener AC.

He coached Cracovia, BSC Young Boys, Alexandria, Admira Wien, Austria (Amateur, most notably at the 1952 Summer Olympics) and SK Rapid Wien.

References

External links
Profile
Profile
Profile

1900 births
1982 deaths
Footballers from Vienna
Austrian footballers
Association football forwards
Floridsdorfer AC players
SpVgg Greuther Fürth players
FC Bayern Munich footballers
FK Austria Wien players
TSV Schwaben Augsburg players
New York Giants (soccer) players
American Soccer League (1921–1933) players
Austria international footballers
Austrian expatriate footballers
Austrian expatriate sportspeople in Germany
Austrian expatriate sportspeople in the United States
Expatriate footballers in Germany
Expatriate soccer players in the United States
Austrian football managers
MKS Cracovia managers
BSC Young Boys managers
SK Rapid Wien managers
FC Admira Wacker Mödling managers
Austria national football team non-playing staff
Turkey national football team non-playing staff
Austrian expatriate football managers
Austrian expatriate sportspeople in Poland
Austrian expatriate sportspeople in Switzerland
Austrian expatriate sportspeople in Turkey
Expatriate football managers in Poland
Expatriate football managers in Switzerland
Expatriate football managers in Turkey